The Lambs and Tigers Game locally referred as the Game of Goats and Tigers (
) or Pulijudam, is a strategic, two-player (or 2 teams) leopard hunt game that is played in south India. The game is asymmetric in that one player controls three tigers and the other player controls up to 15 lambs/goats. The tigers 'hunt' the goats while the goats attempt to block the tigers' movements.

Trivia 
 This is the ancient game played in southern part of India especially in the states of Andhra Pradesh, Karnataka and Tamil Nadu.
 The board is drawn on parapet inside the mahadwara of the Chamundeshwari temple atop Chamundi Betta (hill) in Mysore, Karnataka
 This game helps people to develop strategy and concept of teamwork by teaching that even though weak, if united, one can vanquish the stronger enemy as a team.
 This game is very similar to the Korean game of Yut.

Names 
  Aadu Puli Attam (The Goat and Tiger Game) – Tamil
 Puli-Meka / Puli Joodamu (Tiger Gambling) – Telugu
 Huli Ghatta (Tiger Game) or Adu Huli (Goat Tiger), Huli Katti (Encage the tiger) – Kannada

See also
 Bagh-Chal

Gallery

External links 
Desktop version of Aadu Puli Aatam Game
At Game Pundit
Aadu Puli Attam Online game in tamil

Maths.org.uk Game Description
Android Game – āduhuli – Tiger and Goat
  Android version of Aadu puli Atam Free Game
Aadu Puli Aattam Online game

Traditional board games
Abstract strategy games